The Drava Statistical Region is a statistical region in Slovenia. The largest city in the region is Maribor. The region's name comes from the Drava River and includes land on both banks along its course through Slovenia as well as the Pohorje mountains in the northeast of the region. The Drava is used for the production of hydroelectricity and the fertile land around it is used for agriculture. The share of job vacancies in all available jobs is among the highest in Slovenia and the region has a positive net migration rate but a very high natural decrease, which means an overall decrease in the population.

Cities and towns 
The Drava Statistical Region includes six cities and towns, the largest of which is Maribor.

Administrative divisions 
The Drava Statistical Region comprises the following 41 municipalities:

 Benedikt
 Cerkvenjak
 Cirkulane
 Destrnik
 Dornava
 Duplek
 Gorišnica
 Hajdina
 Hoče–Slivnica
 Juršinci
 Kidričevo
 Kungota
 Lenart
 Lovrenc na Pohorju
 Majšperk
 Makole
 Maribor
 Markovci
 Miklavž na Dravskem Polju
 Oplotnica
 Ormož
 Pesnica
 Podlehnik
 Poljčane
 Ptuj
 Rače–Fram
 Ruše
 Selnica ob Dravi
 Slovenska Bistrica
 Središče ob Dravi
 Starše
 Sveta Ana
 Sveta Trojica v Slovenskih Goricah
 Sveti Andraž v Slovenskih Goricah
 Sveti Jurij v Slovenskih Goricah
 Sveti Tomaž
 Šentilj
 Trnovska Vas
 Videm
 Zavrč
 Žetale

Demographics 
The population in 2020 was 325,994. It has a total area of 2,170 km².

Economy 
Employment structure: 63.4% services, 35.8% industry, 0.8% agriculture.

Tourism 
It attracts only 3.2% of the total number of tourists in Slovenia, most being from foreign countries (68.9%).

Transportation 
 Length of motorways: 132.7 km
 Length of other roads: 6,422.9 km

Sources 

 Slovenian regions in figures 2014

Statistical regions of Slovenia